Korunye is a locality in South Australia beside the Adelaide-Crystal Brook rail line between Two Wells and Mallala. The name derived is from that of the historic railway siding, Korunye Railway Station, within the locality. South Australian historian Geoffrey Manning states that Korunye is from an indigenous word meaning "rainbow".

References

Towns in South Australia